Shrewsbury Cricket Club is an amateur cricket club in Shrewsbury, Shropshire. 

Their 1st XI currently plays in the Birmingham and District Premier League premier division and their 2nd XI plays in the first division. They won the William Younger Cup in 1983 and 2011. They were semi-finalists in the same competition in 2009. In 2010 they won The Birmingham Premier League and won it again in 2013.

They play their home games at London Road, Shrewsbury. 

Chairman: Richard Chapman

1st XI Captain: Rob Foster 

2nd XI Captain: Jon Anders

Alumni

Famous past and current players include:

Joe Hart - England and Tottenham goalkeeper.

James Taylor - Former England and Nottinghamshire batsman and current selector for the England team.

Jack Shantry - Former Worcestershire all-rounder.

Joe Leach - County captain for Worcestershire all-rounder.

See also
Shropshire County Cricket Club

Sport in Shrewsbury
English club cricket teams